TVTV (short for Top Value Television) was a San Francisco-based video collective that produced documentary video works using guerrilla art techniques.

History
The group was founded in 1972 by Allen Rucker, Michael Shamberg, Tom Weinberg, Hudson Marquez, and Megan Williams. Shamberg was the author of the 1971 "do-it-yourself" video production manual Guerrilla Television

TVTV pioneered the use of independent video based on the new and then-revolutionary media, ½" Sony Portapak video equipment, later embracing the ¾" video format.

In 1975 the group left San Francisco for Los Angeles, where it took up a contract with PBS to shoot Supervisions, a series of short tapes on television history.
 
The group disbanded in 1979. Their last production was TVTV: Diary of the Video Guerillas.

Members
Over the years, more than thirty "guerrilla video" makers were participants in TVTV productions. They included members of the Ant Farm (Chip Lord, Doug Michels, Hudson Marquez, and Curtis Schreier) and the Videofreex (Skip Blumberg, Nancy Cain, Chuck Kennedy, and Parry Teasdale). 
Other participants in TVTV included designer Elan Soltes, producer David Axelrod, actor-comedian Bill Murray and his brother Brian Doyle-Murray, cinematographer Paul Goldsmith, actor and director Harold Ramis and producer Wendy Appel (aka Wendy Apple).

In 1976-1977, experimental filmmaker Wheeler Winston Dixon briefly joined the collective, editing most of the Supervision series, as well as portions of the Hard Rain Special and the entirety of The TVTV Show.

Legacy
The move to Los Angeles brought many in the group more into the orbit of conventional filmmaking.
Bill Murray went on to become a film and TV star; Michael Shamberg a film producer, most notably with his company Jersey Films, in collaboration with Stacey Sher and Danny DeVito; Allen Rucker a writer and author; Wheeler Winston Dixon an author and university professor; Harold Ramis a film director, writer and actor; Skip Blumberg a videographer and producer; Tom Weinberg a producer based in his hometown, Chicago; and Elan Soltes a video graphic designer in Hollywood.

The Berkeley Art Museum and Pacific Film Archive has digitized hundreds of hours of raw footage shot for The World's Largest TV Studio, Four More Years, and Gerald Ford's America, along with extensive paper archives. Collections of TVTV productions and footage can also be found at Media Burn Independent Video Archive and Electronic Arts Intermix.

The 2018 film TVTV: Video Revolutionaries by director Paul Goldsmith explored the group's history.

Productions
 The World's Largest TV Studio (1972), covering the 1972 Democratic National Convention
 Four More Years (1972), covering the 1972 Republican National Convention
 Lord of the Universe (1974), an award-winning documentary on the activities of the Guru Maharaj Ji and his followers
 Adland (1974), an examination of American commercial culture 
 Gerald Ford's America (1975)
 The Good Times are Killing Me (1975) a portrait of Cajun culture. Focusing on the Cajuns' strong cultural identity as well as the life of Cajun Musician Nathan Abshire
 TVTV: Super Bowl (1976) concept by Rich Rosen 
 TVTV Looks at the Oscars (1976) concept by Rich Rosen 
 Supervision (1976), a multipart PBS series about the birth of television and its cultural impact
 The Bob Dylan Hard Rain Special (1976), another NBC co-production
 The TVTV Show (1976), TVTV's final television special, co-produced with NBC television, directed by Alan Myerson

See also
Saturday Night Live
History of television
New Journalism

References

External links 
 TVTV at Video Data Bank
 History of TVTV
 World's Largest TV Studio
 Four More Years
 Adland
 Lord of the Universe
 TVTV Goes to the Super Bowl
 Trailer for the documentary TVTV: Video Revolutionaries
 TVTV: VR on IMDB
 Official TVTV: VR'' site

Citizen media
American documentary filmmakers
Television production companies of the United States
1972 establishments in California
1979 disestablishments in California
Companies based in San Francisco
Film collectives